St. Andrew's-Wesley United Church is an affirming church located in the downtown core of Vancouver, British Columbia, Canada. The church was designed by Twizel and Twizel and is constructed from Nelson Island (British Columbia) granite and Haddington Island (British Columbia) stone.

History 
St. Andrew's-Wesley United Church was completed in 1927 for the union of Presbyterian, Methodist, Congregational and Local Union Churches. The name combines the congregations of St. Andrew's Presbyterian and Wesley Methodist.

Methodist missionaries arrived in Vancouver from Britain around 1859. A church was eventually built on Water St. in 1875 but was destroyed in the Great Vancouver Fire of 1886. In 1887, the congregation divided into two: Princess Street and Homer Street.

In 1870, a Presbyterian congregation was organized in a local community schoolhouse. First Presbyterian Church was erected on Cordova Street but was also destroyed in the 1886 fire. The congregation then moved to a larger centre on the corner of Gore and Hastings Streets in 1892. Both church congregations built, inhabited and sold several ever-larger church buildings.

In 1927, St. Andrew's Presbyterian Church on Georgia and Richards, and Wesley Methodist, amalgamated as St. Andrew's Wesley United Church. The sale of that smaller property allowed the growing combined congregations to purchase the current site on Burrard and Nelson streets. The "Cathedral Church of the United Church in B.C." - St. Andrew's-Wesley's new building was opened on May 26, 1933, with Rev. Dr. Willard Brewing as first minister of the united congregation.

See also
 List of heritage buildings in Vancouver

References

Churches completed in 1927
Churches in Vancouver
United Church of Canada churches in British Columbia
Heritage buildings in Vancouver
West End, Vancouver
1927 establishments in British Columbia
20th-century churches in Canada